Götz Kauffmann (15 January 1949 – 26 January 2010) was an Austrian stage, film and television actor, cabaret artist and writer.

Life 
Gottfried Maria Kauffman was born in the fifteenth district of Vienna.   His father was the noted Vienna organ builder, Johann M. Kauffmann (1910-1965).  The Kauffmanns had indeed been active in Vienna as organ builders since 1877: between 1964 and 1968 Götz Kauffmann also studied as an apprentice to master the craft.   He then decided to pursue a career not as an organ builder but as an actor and cabaret artist.   Kauffmann undertook his drama training at Vienna's Max Reinhardt Seminar where he completed the four-year course in 1972.   Early theatre engagements took him to the Salzburger Landestheater and then, in 1977, to the Raimund Theater and the Theater in der Josefstadt in Vienna.

He reached a wider audience through appearances in several long running television series such as "Ein echter Wiener geht nicht unter" (loosely "You can't knock a true Viennese down", 1975-1979) in which he featured as the concierge, "Kurt Blahovec".   There were also "Mozart und Meisel" (1987), in which he played the leading part and "Kaisermühlen Blues" (1992-1999) in which he also took one of the lead roles.   He was also becoming known in film roles, featuring in numerous national and international cinema productions.   He played the part of  Oskar in "Tales from the Vienna Woods" directed by Maximilian Schell and was a member of the cast of "Verlassen Sie bitte Ihren Mann!" ("Please leave your husband", 1993) directed by Reinhard Schwabenitzky, and starring Reinhard Schwabenitzky's wife, Elfi Eschke, Wolfgang Böck and Helmut Griem.   More recently, in 2008, he appeared in "Echte Wiener – Die Sackbauer-Saga" (2008), a successful cinema reprise of the 1970s television series.

Alongside his film career Kauffman continued to sustain his career as a theatre performer, and also pursued his interest in cabaret.   In 1980 he founded the "Arge Kabarett" and in 1983 he presented his first solo programme, "Götz-Zitate".   During his final years he worked as a freelance performer in Vienna, also reprising various lead roles in the Gloria-Theater.

Götz Kauffmann was honoured with the Goldener Rathausmann award by the city of Vienna.   He was also a notable freemason.

His strikingly confessional autobiography, "Meine Abrechnung. Zwischen Kaisermühlen-Blues und Suff", appeared in 1999.   It disclosed a sometimes difficult life, featuring three broken marriages, depression and alcohol issues.  For many years he was also badly affected by diabetes.   A few days before he died Kauffmann was able to celebrate his sixty-first birthday, surrounded by colleagues, his three children and his brother.   His body is buried in the family grave at the Baumgartner Cemetery (Group K1, Nr. 75) in Vienna.

Theatre roles (selection) 

 1970–1972: Die Zwillinge von Venedig, Bauernhof-Theater in Meggenhofen (OÖ)
 1970–1972: Das Kaffeehaus von Carlo Goldoni, Bauernhof-Theater in Meggenhofen (OÖ)
 1970–1972: Urfaust, Bauernhof-Theater in Meggenhofen (OÖ)
 1972: Wie es Euch gefällt (Probstein), Landestheater Salzburg
 1972: Wiener Blut (Kagler), Landestheater Salzburg
 1972: Lumpazivagabundus (Knieriem), Landestheater Salzburg
 1978: Tscharlie der Kegel: Der uneheliche Sohn des Herrn Karl, one person piece by Herwig Seeböck, written for Götz Kauffmann
 1978: Der tolle Tag oder die Hochzeit des Figaro, Salzburger Festspiele
 1979: Die Heirat, Volkstheater Wien
 1980: Die letzten Tag der Menschheit, Wiener Festwochen
 1981–1982: Professuren, Theater der Courage
 1981–1982: Mir san net aso, Theater in der Drachengasse
 1981–1982: Der Talisman, Theater in der Josefstadt
 1981–1982: Liliom, Theater in der Josefstadt
 1985–1986: Turnhalle, Theater in der Drachengasse
 1989: Das vierte Gebot, Sommerfestspiele Berndorf/Stadttheater
 1990: Haben Sie nichts zu verzollen, Theater in der Josefstadt
 1991: Orpheus in der Unterwelt, Wiener Kammeroper
 2005: Wiener Blut, Musik Theater Schönbrunn
 2007: Die Fledermaus, Musik Theater Schönbrunn

Film roles (selection) 

 1971: Tatort - Mordverdacht, at that times till identified as Gottfried Kauffmann
 1975–1979: Ein echter Wiener geht nicht unter
 1976: Die Alpensaga, Teil 1 – Liebe im Dorf
 1977: Tatort – Der vergessene Mord
 1977: Die Alpensaga, Teil 3 – Das große Fest
 1978: Aus dem Leben eines Dicken
 1978: Singles
 1979: Tales from the Vienna Woods
 1980: Car-napping
 1981: Kottan ermittelt – Die Beförderung
 1984: 
 1987: Mozart und Meisel
 1992–1999: Kaisermühlen Blues
 1993: Verlassen Sie bitte Ihren Mann!
 1993: Die Rebellion
 1995: Schwarze Tage
 1995: Tödliche Liebe
 1995: El Chicko – der Verdacht
 1996: Der See
 1996: 
 1999: Fink fährt ab
 2001–2002: Dolce Vita & Co 2001: Ene mene muh – und tot bist du 2008:  Cabaret (selection) 

 1977: Stichwort über … 1983: Götz-Zitate (first solo programme)
 1987: Aber der Kopf is’ no oben 1988: Geschafft 1988: Duell/Duett 1988: Alles Theater 1991: Mir stinkt’s 1999: Tick Tak Talk 1999: Warten auf die Talkshow Books 

 Meine Abrechnung. Zwischen Kaisermühlen-Blues und Suff. Ueberreuter, Wien 1999. 
 Küss die Hand? Mein Wiener Wörterbuch''. Verlag 66, Amstetten 2003.

References

Male actors from Vienna
Austrian male writers
Austrian cabaret performers
Austrian male film actors
Austrian male stage actors
Austrian Freemasons
1949 births
2010 deaths